Circle 'Round the Sun is the third album by American guitarist Leo Kottke, released in 1970.

History
Eight of its eleven songs are studio re-recordings of songs from his first (live) album 12-String Blues. Although they should have been improved by being recorded in a professional studio, there is noticeable oversaturation in many of the songs, causing his vocal to break up.  Kottke has often been quoted as being unhappy with the recording quality. It has not been re-issued on CD.

Reception

Writing for Allmusic, music critic Chip Renner called the album "This is a good, hard to find record."

Track listing
All songs by Leo Kottke except as noted

Side one
 "If Momma Knew" § – 2:30
 "Furry Jane" § – 1:45
 "Sweet Louise" § – 3:04
 "Tell Me Mama" (Traditional) – 2:58
 "Long Way Up the River" § – 2:18

Side two
 "Circle 'Round the Sun" § – 3:23
 "So Cold in China" § – 4:04
 "Easter and the Sargasso Sea" § – 3:09
 "The Prodigal Grave" § – 2:39
 "Living in the Country" § (Pete Seeger) – 1:21
 "Tell Me This Ain't the Blues" – 2:53

§ = previously recorded on 12-String Blues

Personnel
Leo Kottke - 6 & 12-string guitar, vocals

Production notes
Engineered by Bob Schultz, Roger Wilhelmi, Skip Hotchkiss, George Hanson
Production: Skip Hotchkiss, George Hanson

References

External links
 Leo Kottke's official site
 Unofficial Leo Kottke web site (fan site)

1970 albums
Leo Kottke albums